Erika Hoff (born 1951) is a developmental psychologist and an expert on language development and bilingualism.  She is a professor of psychology at Florida Atlantic University, where she directs the Language Development Laboratory.

Hoff is the author of a popular textbook Language Development. She has co-edited several books including Research Methods in Child Language: A Practical Guide, Blackwell Handbook of Language Development, and Childhood Bilingualism: Research on Infancy Through School Age.

Biography 
Hoff completed a Bachelor of Science degree in education at the University of Michigan in 1972. After completing a Master of Science degree at Rutgers University, Hoff returned to the University of Michigan where she completed her PhD in Psychology in 1981 under the supervision of Marilyn Shatz. Her dissertation, which was funded by the National Science Foundation, focused on the role of linguistic input in children's language development.  Prior to joining the faculty of Florida Atlantic University, Hoff was a member of the faculty at the University of Wisconsin-Parkside.

Hoff has conducted extensive research on the acquisition of language in different social contexts and on bilingualism and dual language development, funded by grants from the National Institute of Child Health and Human Development. Hoff's research has emphasized how socioeconomic disparities and other environmental factors impact children's language development. In particular, her work highlights how variation in the quality of maternal child-directed speech across families may explain individual differences in children's language development trajectories.

Hoff has conducted extensive longitudinal research on monolingual and bilingual children's language development in South Florida, underscoring how variation in the amount of exposure to each language impacts rates of language development. She has shown that in the early stages of language development, the English skills of children learning Spanish and English at the same time lag behind the English skills of monolingual children. However, when bilingual children's skills in both of their languages are considered, they know as much or more than monolingual children.  Growing up in a bilingual homes does not guarantee children's success in acquiring Spanish. One relevant factor is language use. Children who only hear but do not speak Spanish are less likely to end up as Spanish speakers.

Representative publications

References

External links 
 Faculty page
 Language development lab
 

American women psychologists
21st-century American psychologists
Developmental psychologists
Florida Atlantic University faculty
University of Michigan School of Education alumni
Living people
American women academics
21st-century American women
Women linguists
1951 births
20th-century American psychologists